De Cesare or DeCesare may refer to: 

De Cesare may refer to:
Nicolò De Cesare - Italian footballer 
Ciro De Cesare - Italian footballer 
John De Cesare - American sculptor 

DeCesare is a surname and may refer to:
 Carmella DeCesare (born 1982), American model
 David DeCesare alias David Chase (born 1945), American writer, director and television producer

Italian-language surnames